USA Judo (officially known as United States Judo, Inc.) is a non-profit organization which represents all areas of U.S. judo practitioners, including athletes, coaches, referees and others. The organization is managed by a staff of seven at the USA Judo National Office which is located at the U.S. Olympic Training Center in Colorado Springs, Colorado. Keith Bryant was the CEO/Executive Director of USA Judo as of August 2016. Mark C. Hill replaced Lance Nading as Board President in 2017.

See also
United States Judo Federation
United States Judo Association

References

External links
 

United States
Judo
Judo in the United States
National members of the International Judo Federation
Judo organizations